77 Heartbreaks is a 2017 Hong Kong romantic drama film directed by Herman Yau. It was released in Hong Kong on 15 June 2017. The sequel 77 Heartwarmings, starring Charlene Choi, Pakho Chau and Mario Maurer will be released in Hong Kong on 14 May 2021.

Plot
Eva is frustrated by her boyfriend Adam's irresponsible habits. One evening when he is late for a date, she visits a small shop and browses a display of notebooks which appear to be designed with artistic and philosophical themes. She becomes attracted to a notebook called 77 Heartbreaks, which the shopkeeper explains is based on the number of times that a reasonable person can be expected to forgive someone for hurting them. Before long, Eva manages to fill the notebook completely with examples of Adam's annoying behavior. After Eva leaves, Adam eventually comes to understand why their relationship ended.

Cast
Charlene Choi
Pakho Chau
Michelle Wai
Anthony Wong
Kara Hui
Lawrence Cheng
Yumiko Cheng
Candy Lo
Rachel Lui

Release
The film was released in Hong Kong on 15 June 2017 and in mainland China on 23 June 2017.

Reception
The film has grossed  in mainland China.

References

External links

Films directed by Herman Yau
2017 romantic drama films
Hong Kong romantic drama films
Emperor Motion Pictures films
2010s Cantonese-language films
2010s Hong Kong films